The Continental Baking Company was one of the first bakeries to introduce fortified bread. It was the maker of the Twinkie and Wonder Bread.  Through a series of acquisitions and mergers it became part of the former Hostess Brands company.

History

In 1849, James Ward and his son, Hugh Ward, who came from Belfast, Ireland, opened a small bakery on Broome Street in New York City. 
In 1884, Hugh Ward and his son Robert Boyd Ward moved to Allegheny city (now, Pittsburgh) and opened a new bakery there.

The Ward Bread Company was organized by Robert B. Ward in New York, Brooklyn and Newark in 1900. Around 1910, The Ward's Bakeries built two big factories in Bronx, NY(143rd St. and Southern Boulevard) and Brooklyn, NY (Vanderbilt Ave and Pacific Street), which "marks a triumphant return to New York". By November 1911, the company starts to sell their famous "Ward's Tip-top Bread" for 5 & 10 cents loaves.

In 1921, grandson William Ward took over the company and in 1925 renamed it the Continental Baking Company.

Continental Baking acquired the Wagner Baking Company in Detroit, Michigan and other 3 companies at the end of 1924. In 1925 it bought Taggart Baking Company, the maker of Wonder Bread, and became the largest commercial bakery in the United States. Twinkie snack cakes were invented in 1930 in Schiller Park, Illinois, by James Alexander Dewar, a baker at Continental Baking Company.

Continental was based in New York from 1923 to 1984. It also had its executive offices in Hoboken, New Jersey. M. Lee Marshall, descendant of John Marshall, was President, later, Chairman, from 1934-1944, and director of distribution in the War Food Administration in 1944.

Continental was purchased by ITT in 1968, then sold to Ralston Purina in 1984. It was purchased by Interstate Bakeries Corporation in 1995. The combined company was rebranded Hostess Brands in 2009. 

Hostess Brands (the former Interstate Bakeries Corporation) closed in 2012. During the liquidation process, it again changed its name, to Old HB. An entirely new and separate entity, New HB Acquisition LLC, was established in 2013, 50% owned by HB Holdings, LLC, a venture set up by Apollo Global Management and C. Dean Metropoulos and Company. New HB Acquisition acquired the brand names and some plants and other assets from Old HB, then renamed itself as Hostess Brands.

References

External links
 
 
 Hostess Brands (old)
 Hostess Brands (new)

Bakeries of the United States
Snack food manufacturers of the United States
Hostess Brands
Ralston Purina
Defunct companies based in New York City
American companies established in 1849
Food and drink companies established in 1849
Companies disestablished in 1995
1849 establishments in New York (state)
1995 disestablishments in New York (state)
ITT Inc.